The 2007 UNAF U-20 Tournament was the 3rd edition of the UNAF U-20 Tournament. The tournament took place in Libya, from 25 to 30 December 2007. Tunisia wins the tournament for the second time.

Participants

 (hosts)

Tournament

Matches

Champion

References

2007 in African football
UNAF U-20 Tournament
UNAF U-20 Tournament